The Fisher FP-101 is an American single-seat, high-wing, conventional landing gear, tractor configuration single engine ultralight aircraft that was available in kit form from Lite Flite of South Webster, Ohio and later Fisher Flying Products of Edgeley, North Dakota.

Development
The FP-101 was designed by Michael Fisher of Lite Flite and first flown in the middle of 1982. It was intended to meet the requirements of the US FAR 103 Ultralight Vehicles category, including that category's maximum  empty weight. The company name was later changed to Fisher Flying Products and production continued under that company name until the FP-101 was supplanted in production by the Fisher FP-202 Koala.

The aircraft is of predominantly wooden construction, with a wooden geodesic fuselage and wood framed wings and tail surfaces all covered in doped aircraft fabric. The high wing is supported by aluminum "V" struts with jury struts. The control system is standard three-axis type including ailerons, elevators and tail-mounted rudder. The conventional configuration fixed main landing gear is made from steel tube with bungee suspension, while the tail wheel is steerable. The engine cowling is built from fiberglass. Pilot access to the cockpit is via a fold-down door on the right-hand side of the fuselage. The windshield is fashioned from Lexan and side windows are optional.

The standard powerplant when the aircraft was introduced was the  Rotax 277 single cylinder, two-stroke powerplant driving a two-bladed wooden propeller. Recoil start was standard, with electric start as optional.

Operational history
The majority of FP-101s were delivered to customers in the United States where they are flown as unregistered ultralights. In October 2009 eight were registered in the US as Experimental - Amateur-builts and eleven were registered in Canada as basic ultra-light aeroplanes.

Specifications (FP-101)

See also

References

External links

1980s United States ultralight aircraft
Aircraft first flown in 1982
High-wing aircraft
Single-engined tractor aircraft